Falling Over Backwards is a Canadian comedy film, directed by Mort Ransen and released in 1990.

Plot
The film stars Saul Rubinek as Mel Rosenblum, a newly divorced schoolteacher suffering a mid-life crisis, who decides to reconstruct the happier times in his life by engineering the reunion of his divorced parents Harvey (Paul Soles) and Rose (Helen Hughes). Meanwhile, Mel himself is drawn into a nascent relationship with Jackie (Julie Saint-Pierre), his landlady, which is complicated when Jackie discovers that she is pregnant by her previous boyfriend and considers having an abortion.

Cast
 Saul Rubinek as Mel Rosenblum
 Paul Soles as Harvey Rosenblum
 Julie Saint-Pierre as Jackie
 Helen Hughes as Rose Rosenblum
 Vlasta Vrána as Drunk
 Harry Standjofski as Club Manager
 Aidan Devine as Young Man

Reception
The film was compared by critics to a Jewish version of a Michel Tremblay play. Ransen described it as the film that led to his decision to leave the National Film Board to work as an independent director, as he could not imagine the board approving the project.

The film received two Genie Award nominations at the 12th Genie Awards in 1991, for Best Supporting Actor (Soles) and Best Sound Editing (Gudrun Christian, Andy Malcolm, Michelle Cooke, Abby Jack Neidik and Diane Le Floch).

References

External links
 

1990 films
1990 comedy films
Canadian comedy films
English-language Canadian films
Films shot in Montreal
Films set in Montreal
Films directed by Mort Ransen
1990s English-language films
1990s Canadian films